Ray Farman (2 March 1927 – 1 July 1996) was a New Zealand cricketer. He played eleven first-class matches for Auckland between 1957 and 1960.

See also
 List of Auckland representative cricketers

References

External links
 

1927 births
1996 deaths
New Zealand cricketers
Auckland cricketers
Cricketers from Auckland